Hüseyin Kalpar (born 25 February 1955) is a Turkish football coach and former player who is currently the manager of Pendikspor.

Coaching career 
He started his coaching career as an assistant coach of Gaziantepspor in the 1994-95 season. After three seasons at Gaziantepspor, he joined Altay as an assistant coach. One season later, he returned his former team Gaziantepspor as a manager. After working there for one and a half seasons, he left Gaziantepspor and managed many other Süper Lig and 1. Lig clubs in the following years. On 31 May 2011, he was named as the manager for Çaykur Rizespor. He became the manager of Pendikspor in 2020.

References

External links 
  (as coach)
 

1955 births
Turkish footballers
Turkish football managers
Living people
Sarıyer S.K. managers
Association football midfielders